Lac Dumoine is a lake in Abitibi-Témiscamingue region, in southern Quebec, Canada.

References

Lakes of Abitibi-Témiscamingue